John Galbraith may refer to:
 John Kenneth Galbraith (1908–2006), Canadian-American economist
 John Galbraith (Pennsylvania politician) (1794–1860), Pennsylvania politician
 Jack Galbraith (1898–?), Scottish footballer
 John Galbraith Graham (1921–2013), British crossword compiler
 John Semple Galbraith (1916–2003), British historian and former Chancellor of the University of California
 John Galbraith (Ohio politician) (1923–2021), American politician, member of the Ohio House of Representatives
 John B. Galbraith (1828–1869), American politician from Florida